Marthe Distel was a French journalist.

Career
Marthe Distel started the culinary magazine La Cuisinière Cordon Bleu. To prompt readership, Distel offered subscribers cooking lessons with professional chefs. The first class was held in January 1895 in the kitchens of the Palais Royal. The classes led to the development of a more formal school, now known as Le Cordon Bleu.

Heritage
On her death in the 1930s, Distel left the school to an orphanage, which struggled to manage it. The school closed during World War II, and was later bought by another French woman, Élisabeth Brassart.

The magazine ceased publication in the 1960s, but the school has evolved from its single location in Paris to more than 27 schools in 17 countries.

References

External links
Cordon Bleu Home page

19th-century births
1930s deaths
French chefs
French magazine founders
French journalists
French women company founders
Women chefs
Founders of educational institutions